Maho Fujishiro (born 17 May 2000) is a Japanese professional footballer who plays as a defender for WE League club JEF United Chiba Ladies.

Club career 
Fujishiro made her WE League debut on 20 September 2021.

References 

WE League players
Living people
2000 births
Japanese women's footballers
Women's association football defenders
Association football people from Chiba Prefecture
JEF United Chiba Ladies players